Upper Marlboro may refer to a community in the United States:

 Upper Marlboro, Maryland, a town
 Greater Upper Marlboro, Maryland, a mailing address and former census-designated place surrounding the incorporated town